Thyreus is an Old World genus of bees, one of many that are commonly known as cuckoo bees, and are cleptoparasites of other species of bees, mostly in the genus Amegilla. They all have strongly contrasting patterns of coloration - three species from the Sydney region, Thyreus nitidulus, T. lugubris, and T. caeruleopunctatus are bright blue and black.

Species

 Thyreus abdominalis (Friese, 1905)
 Thyreus abyssinicus (Radoszkowski, 1873)
 Thyreus affinis (Morawitz, 1874)
 Thyreus africana (Radoszkowski, 1893)
 Thyreus aistleitneri Straka & Engel, 2012
 Thyreus albolateralis (Cockerell, 1919)
 Thyreus albomaculatus (DeGeer, 1778)
 Thyreus alfkeni (Brauns, 1909)
 Thyreus altaicus (Radoszkowski, 1893)
 Thyreus axillaris (Vachal, 1903)
 Thyreus batelkai Straka & Engel, 2012
 Thyreus bimaculatus (Radoszkowski, 1893)
 Thyreus bouyssoui (Vachal, 1903)
 Thyreus brachyaspis (Cockerell, 1936)
 Thyreus caeruleopunctatus (Blanchard, 1840)
 Thyreus calceatus (Vachal, 1903)
 Thyreus callurus (Cockerell, 1919)
 Thyreus calophanes Lieftinck, 1962
 Thyreus castalius Lieftinck, 1962
 Thyreus centrimacula (Pérez, 1905)
 Thyreus ceylonicus (Friese, 1905)
 Thyreus chinensis (Radoszkowski, 1893)
 Thyreus cyathiger Lieftinck, 1962
 Thyreus decorus (Smith, 1852)
 Thyreus delumbatus (Vachal, 1903)
 Thyreus denolii Straka & Engel, 2012
 Thyreus elegans (Morawitz, 1878)
 Thyreus empeyi Eardley, 1991
 Thyreus erythraeensis (Meyer, 1921)
 Thyreus fallibilis (Kohl, 1906)
 Thyreus forchhammeri Eardley, 1991
 Thyreus formosanus (Meyer, 1921)
 Thyreus fortissimus (Cockerell & Mackie, 1933)
 Thyreus frieseanus (Cockerell, 1905)
 Thyreus gambiensis (Cockerell & Mackie, 1933)
 Thyreus garouensis Engel, 2014
 Thyreus grahami (Cockerell, 1910)
 Thyreus hellenicus Lieftinck, 1968
 Thyreus himalayensis (Radoszkowski, 1893)
 Thyreus hirtus (de Beaumont, 1940)
 Thyreus histrio (Fabricius, 1775)
 Thyreus histrionicus (Illiger, 1806)
 Thyreus hohmanni Schwarz, 1993
 Thyreus hyalinatus (Vachal, 1903)
 Thyreus illudens Lieftinck, 1968
 Thyreus impexus Lieftinck, 1968
 Thyreus incultus Lieftinck, 1968
 Thyreus insignis (Meyer, 1921)
 Thyreus insolitus Lieftinck, 1962
 Thyreus interruptus (Vachal, 1903)
 Thyreus irena Lieftinck, 1962
 Thyreus janasivius (Sivik, 1957)
 Thyreus kilimandjaricus (Strand, 1911)
 Thyreus lieftincki Rozen, 1969
 Thyreus lugubris (Smith, 1879)
 Thyreus luzonensis (Cockerell, 1910)
 Thyreus macleayi (Cockerell, 1907)
 Thyreus maculiscutis (Cameron, 1905)
 Thyreus massuri (Radoszkowski, 1893)
 Thyreus medius (Meyer, 1921)
 Thyreus meripes (Vachal, 1903)
 Thyreus neavei (Cockerell, 1933)
 Thyreus nigroventralis (Meyer, 1921)
 Thyreus niloticus (Cockerell, 1937)
 Thyreus nitidulus (Fabricius, 1804)
 Thyreus novaehollandiae (Lepeletier, 1841)
 Thyreus nubicus (Lepeletier, 1841)
 Thyreus orbatus (Lepeletier, 1841)
 Thyreus oxaspis (Cockerell, 1936)
 Thyreus parthenope Lieftinck, 1968
 Thyreus pica (Strand, 1921)
 Thyreus picaron Lieftinck, 1968
 Thyreus picicornis (Morawitz, 1875)
 Thyreus pictus (Smith, 1854)
 Thyreus plumifer (Brauns, 1909)
 Thyreus praestans Lieftinck, 1962
 Thyreus praevalens (Kohl, 1905)
 Thyreus pretextus (Vachal, 1903)
 Thyreus priesneri Lieftinck, 1968
 Thyreus proximus (Meyer, 1921)
 Thyreus quadrimaculatus (Radoszkowski, 1883)
 Thyreus quinquefasciatus (Smith, 1879)
 Thyreus ramosellus (Cockerell, 1919)
 Thyreus ramosus (Lepeletier, 1841)
 Thyreus regalis Lieftinck, 1962
 Thyreus rotundatus (Friese, 1905)
 Thyreus rufitarsus (Rayment, 1931)
 Thyreus schwarzi Straka & Engel, 2012
 Thyreus scotaspis (Vachal, 1903)
 Thyreus scutellaris (Fabricius, 1781)
 Thyreus sejuncta (Saussure, 1890)
 Thyreus shebicus Engel, 2014
 Thyreus sicarius Lieftinck, 1962
 Thyreus smithii (Dalla Torre, 1896)
 Thyreus somalicus (Strand, 1911)
 Thyreus sphenophorus Lieftinck, 1962
 Thyreus splendidulus (Lepeletier, 1841)
 Thyreus stellifera (Cockerell, 1936)
 Thyreus strandi (Meyer, 1921)
 Thyreus surniculus Lieftinck, 1959
 Thyreus takaonis (Cockerell, 1911)
 Thyreus tinctus (Cockerell, 1905)
 Thyreus tricuspis (Pérez, 1883)
 Thyreus truncatus (Pérez, 1883)
 Thyreus tschoffeni (Vachal, 1903)
 Thyreus uniformis (W. F. Kirby, 1900)
 Thyreus vachali (Friese, 1905)
 Thyreus wallacei (Cockerell, 1905)
 Thyreus waroonensis (Cockerell, 1913)

See also

External links

Apinae
Bee genera
Hymenoptera of Africa
Hymenoptera of Asia
Hymenoptera of Europe